Higher Institutions Football League (HiFL) is an annual football competition for higher education institutions in Nigeria. The League is open to all member universities of the Nigerian University Games Association (NUGA) and all games except the Final Four are played in the campuses of participating schools. Winners of the League are scheduled to represent Nigeria at the Summer Universiade of the International University Sports Federation (FISU) games. HiFL® is the football franchise of Higher Institutions Sports League (HiSL™), an asset created and managed by PACE Sports and Entertainment Marketing Limited.

History 
HiFL, established in 2017 was launched in February 2018 as the premier franchise of the Higher Institutions Sports League, HiSL™ and its first season features an inaugural 16 universities with eight (8) from the South (Coastal Conference) and eight (8) from the North (Sahel Conference). The participating teams for the maiden edition were recommended by our partners, the Nigerian University Games Association (NUGA) based on recent performances in the NUGA games and government endowment. The participating teams for the 2018 edition were recommended by the Nigerian University Games Association (NUGA) based on recent performances in the NUGA games & government endowment and the University of Agriculture, Makurdi (UAM) Tillers emerged as the maiden winners after defeating the University of Calabar Malabites 5 – 4 on penalties.

The 2019 season began in late April with a qualifying round played by over 40 universities across different zones. The surviving teams joined the top four teams from the 2018 season to the final quota of 32. The 32 teams were then drawn into 8 groups of four teams and play in a round-robin system. The eight group winners (including the seeded teams from last year’s Super Four – UAM Tillers, UNICAL Malabites, OAU Giants and UNILORIN Warriors) and eight runners-up proceed to the knockout phase that culminated with the Super Four Finals in late October at Lagos.

Presently, the competition is only open to the male football teams of the participating universities with the female teams to be added in subsequent editions.

Administrative structure 
Executive Management Board: The board tasked with the League's management in conjunction with NUGA in overseeing, enforcing and adjudicating the regulations of the competition.

Main Organising Committee (MOC): The body responsible for the operational execution and day-to-day management of the league.

Local Organising Committees (LOC): This refers to the group of individuals who help to organize matches on behalf of participating schools in the HiFL® competition and/or qualifiers, and in close cooperation with the organizers. The minimum composition of an HiFL LOC embraces representatives of the school's sports management, students’ union/association/council or representatives of the association, security services, medical services and the school's press officer.

Regulations 
The HiFL® regulations refers to the statute as adopted by the Executive Management Board (EMB) that contain the basic principles and detailed rules regarding the governance of the HiFL games and competition.

In particular, they specify, based on the fundamental structure, general principles regarding the internal organisation of the MOC, LOC and EMB. They further specify, within the framework of the general regime of competences the general principles regarding the duties, powers and responsibilities of certain bodies, units and other entities of HiFL® as well as of the members of those bodies.

Finally, the Regulations clearly defines best practices regarding the execution of the competition in its entirety.

Format 
The Higher Institutions Football League begins with a return-leg elimination of 16 teams, however, in the 2019 season it had 32 teams playing in a round-robin group stage. The participating universities are member institutions of NUGA. The 32 teams were then drawn into 8 groups of four teams and play in a round-robin system. The eight group winners (including the seeded teams from last year’s Super Four – UAM Tillers, UNICAL Malabites, OAU Giants and UNILORIN Warriors) and eight runners-up proceed to the knockout phase.

For this stage, the winning team from one group plays against the runners-up from another group, in the same geographical distribution – Coastal or Sahel. This condition remained through the Quarter Final and Semi-Final until the Super Four where the winners from inter-conference matches battled to determine who lifts the trophy.

Generally, each school has a registration pool of 30 individuals – 26 players and 4 officials. However, the school’s game-day team will be represented by a squad of twenty-two (22) individuals. Eighteen (18) are players and four (4) make up the team officials. They are the Coach, Assistant Coach, Team Manager, and Medical Officer.

The tournament uses the away goals rule: if the aggregate score of the two games is tied, then the team who scored more goals at their opponent's stadium advances.

Brand and emblem 

The HiFL icon is based on three distinct objects and they include:
 Graduation Cap: The angular shape and edges reflects a graduation cap or “mortarboard” as it is sometimes called. This helps to visually restate the mission of HiFL that is supporting the passion of youths especially those domiciled in academia. 
 Football: The geometric network of patterns on the logo is inspired by those on a football. 
 Ankara: The icon gains its dynamic and lively color from the vibrant hues of the African wax print popularly Ankara. This also further entrenches the essence and ownership of the brand as African and original.

Trophy and medals 

The HiFL Champions Cup also known as the Ultimate trophy, is the trophy awarded at the end of each season to the team that wins the HiFL Competition. The trophy remains in HiFL's keeping and ownership at all times. A full-size replica trophy is awarded to each winner of the competition. In the 2019 season, the UAM Tillers enjoyed the distinction of wearing the logo of the league set on a gold background for the duration of the 2019 season. The UNICAL Malabites will enjoy this distinction as the current league winners.

Also a club that wins three consecutive times or five times overall will receive a multiple-winner badge.

Theme song 
The official HiFL Theme Song, titled simply as “Game Changers™” was written by Rocketshop, one of the project’s commercial partners and recorded by pop star Kola Soul in May 2018. 
“Game Changers™  is a rousing clarion call that ties into the dreams and aspirations of young Nigerians by igniting their passion while at the same time promoting the values of unity and sportsmanship among the players and fan at large.

The theme song was officially released as part of the build-up towards the 2018 HiFL season as a cover song competition #TheHiFLChallenge to loads of buzz and fanfare.

The anthem is to be played before every HiFL game at a stadium hosting such an event and also before and at the end of every television broadcast of a HiFL game as a musical element of the competition's opening sequence.

Conferences 
The Conferences for HiFL are structured along Nigeria's regional lines; the North and the South.

The North, called the Sahel Conference comprises higher institutions from states such as Adamawa, Bauchi, Benue, Borno, F.C.T – Abuja, Gombe, Jigawa, Kaduna, Kano, Katsina, Kebbi, Kogi, Kwara, Nasarawa, Niger, Plateau, Sokoto, Taraba, Yobe and Zamfara.

The South, known as the Coastal Conference consists higher institutions from states such as Abia, Akwa Ibom, Anambra, Bayelsa, Cross River, Delta, Ebonyi, Edo, Ekiti, Enugu, Imo, Lagos, Ogun, Ondo, Osun, Oyo and Rivers.

2018 season summary 
In the 2018 Season, the teams were divided into two groups of 4 across two conferences; Coastal (South) and Sahel (North) with respect to their respective geographical locations in the country from which they played in return leg elimination style across four stages; Preliminaries, Quarter Finals, Semi Finals and then the Final Four where the two winners from each of the conferences battled for the prize.

Qualification for the 2018 HiFL competition was open to all member universities of NUGA. However, the participating universities for the maiden edition were selected based on strong sporting/academic parameters and government endowment.

The competition is open to all member universities of NUGA and the participating schools will emerge after a round of qualifiers. However, the participating universities for the maiden edition were selected based on strong sporting/academic parameters and government endowment.

The following table lists the participating schools by conference and in alphabetical order. They are;

COASTAL CONFERENCE

SAHEL CONFERENCE

The 2018 HiFL® Season was marked by top quality and attacking football, excellent players and a positive general football philosophy. The teams’ objectives were to score and win matches instead of trying not to lose or concede. This led to a glut of goals, 63 in total at an impressive average of 2.1 goals per match.

The tournament also witnessed the rise and development of teams such as DELSU Titans and UDU Sultans, who successfully and efficiently challenged the more established teams. Speed, tempo and power football has never been so high. Many matches were end-to-end affairs, and a lot of games were not decided until the very end. Often little details made all the difference between winning and losing. The most successful teams had key players in all areas who had a major influence with their play, work rate, personality and outstanding performances.

Moreover, the league was an extremely balanced affair. Most of the matches in the competition went to down to the wire, and the odd case penalties to separate the team like in the final where UAM Tillers defeated UNICAL Malabites 5-4 to be crowned champions.

2018 season duration 
The 2018 season which ran from 28 July 2018 to 3 November 2018,

Tournament 
The teams are divided into groups of 8 across two conferences; Coastal (South) and Sahel (North) with respect to their respective geographical locations in the country.

i. Preliminaries: The 8 teams across each pool are further divided into groups A and B giving Coastal A & B and Sahel A & B respectively. The teams are paired off to play return-leg elimination games to determine the quarter finalists.

ii. Quarter Finals: The winners from after the first round of elimination games in each of the groups square off for a chance to qualify to the next round.

iii. Semi Finals: The quarter final winners from the Coastal conference pair off against the winners from the Sahel conference for a chance to play in the HiFL championship game.

iv.  Final Four: The final and third place matches will be held at the Teslim Balogun Stadium in Lagos. The games will involve the winners and losers from the semifinal matches do battle for the trophy and the runners up spots.

Hosting 
For the 2018 season of the competition, each of the participating institutions had the opportunity to host at least one game after which they then travelled to play the corresponding fixture in the ‘home’ of their opponent to determine the winner of the series. This system was designed to ensure maximum participation and engagement for the students across all the participating schools.

2018 HiFL Elite Awards 
The HiFL Elite Awards is an annual football award presented by Higher Institutions Football League (HiFL®). It was first presented in 2018 as part of a series of event to commemorate the close of the inaugural season to recognize and celebrate outstanding performers in the league.

The HiFL Elite Player of the Year

The HiFL Elite Coach of the Year

The HiFL Elite Goalkeeper of the Year

The HiFL Elite Goal of the Year

The HiFL Elite Host of the Year

The HiFL Elite Goal Scorer of the Year

The HiFL Elite Platinum Award

2019 season summary 
The 2019 season was expanded to include 32 University teams playing 66 games over 21 weeks to determine the winner of the Ultimate Champions Trophy. The season ran from April – October 2019 and culminated with the Super Four on the 26th of October at the Lagos Agege Stadium.

The 2019 season featured a brand-new system including a group stage of 32 teams, divided into eight groups across the two conferences. Seeding was used in making the draw for this stage, and teams will be drawn in groups together with respect to their geographical locations. The winning team and the runners-up from each group then progress to the Round of 16 to join the 2018 Super Four teams (UAM Tillers, UNICAL Malabites, OAU Giants and UNILORIN Warriors) from last year which gained automatic qualification.

For this stage, the winning team from one group plays against the runners-up from another group, in the same geographical distribution – Coastal or Sahel. This condition remained through the Quarter Final and Semi-Final until the Super Four where the winners from inter-conference matches battled to determine who lifts the trophy. The 2019 format retained the use of the away goals rule to determine the winners in the knock out stage.

The following table lists the participating schools of the 2019 Season in alphabetical order;

2019 season duration 
The season ran from April – October 2019 and culminated with the Super Four on the 26th of October at the Lagos Agege Stadium.

Tournament 
The 2019 HiFL® Season saw the improvement in technical and tactical play, given that a section of the coaches was tutored by coaches from Manchester City during the Pre-League Coaching Clinic organised in partnership with Premier Cool.

Most of the teams started to play off from the back: only 19 percent of passes were played long in the 2019 tournament, a decrease from the previous edition, which suggests that teams were progressively looking to play shorter passes and build patiently, as opposed to going long and direct. There were no underdogs as newer teams such as KUST Pyramids and FUTA Tigers proved they were no pushovers as they successfully and efficiently challenged the more established teams. 122 goals were scored in total at an average of 1.9 goals per match.

In all, the season culminated in the final where UNICAL Malabites defeated the defending champions, UAM Tillers 5-4 on penalties after regulation time to be crowned champions.

Hosting 
Each of the participating institutions hosted at least one home game each and travelled to play the corresponding fixture in the ‘home’ of their opponent to determine the winner of the series. This system is designed to ensure maximum participation and engagement for the students across all the participating schools.

In the new format for the 2019 season, there were 24 host institutions including 8 group stage hosts after which it reverts to the 2018 hosting format in the knock out stages.

2019 HiFL Elite Awards 
The HiFL Elite Awards is a continuation from the first edition in 2018 as part of a series of events to commemorate the close of the inaugural season to recognize and celebrate outstanding performers in the league.

The HiFL Fair Play Award was introduced in the 2019 event.

Below is the list of nominees and winners in each category;

The HiFL Elite Player of the Year

The HiFL Elite Coach of the Year

The HiFL Elite Goal of the Year

The HiFL Elite Host of the Year

The HiFL Elite Team of the Season 
Team formation is 4-3-3

The HiFL Elite Platinum Award 
The 2019 distinguished honorary award went to:

The HiFL Fair Play Award 
This award is in recognition of exemplary behaviour and outstanding acts of sportsmanship.

2020 season summary 
Due to the global COVID-19 pandemic that raged the world in 2020, HiFL was organized in form of e-sports. HiFL, in partnership with La Liga, introduced a virtual football league experience involving the nation’s top Universities called the HiFL eINVITATIONAL. The league involved gamers across 8 universities in Nigeria.

Winner

LEADCITY Gladiators

Runners up

FUTA Tigers

Despite the constraints on general gatherings to help curb the spread of the COVID-19 pandemic, Higher Institution Football League(HiFL) joined the rest of the world in celebrating her first-ever International Day of University Sport.

2021 season summary 
In the 2021 season, the teams were divided into five groups of varying numbers across 5 zones; Bayero University Kano, Federal University of Technology Minna (FUTMINNA), Lagos State University (LASU), University of Benin (UNIBEN), University of Uyo, Akwa Ibom (UNIUYO) with respect to their respective geographical locations in the country from which they played in return leg elimination style across four stages; Round of 16, Quarter Finals, Semi Finals and Final Four.

The competition is open to all member universities of NUGA and the participating schools will emerge after a round of qualifiers.

List of the participating schools by zones

2021 season duration 
The 2021 season ran from 20 April 2021 to 10 October 2021.

Tournament 
QUALIFIERS STAGE/GROUP STAGE

The 25 teams are divided into 5 zones respectively. The teams are paired to play each other at least once. The winning team and the runners-up from each group then progress to the next round.

KNOCKOUT STAGE

Immediately after the qualifiers stage, HiFL 2021 draws took place in other to determine how the next stages of the competition. The draw is entirely random. The knock-out ties are played in a two-legged format, with the exception of the final.

Super Four Finals

The final and third place matches was held at Yaba College of Technology Sports Complex in Lagos. The games will involve the winners and losers from the semi-final matches do battle for the trophy and the runners up spots.

Hosting

For the 2021 season of the competition, each of the participating institutions had the opportunity to host at least one game after which they then travelled to play the corresponding fixture in the ‘home’ of their opponent to determine the winner of the series. This system was designed to ensure maximum participation and engagement for the students across all the participating schools.

2021 HiFL Elite Awards

The HiFL Elite Awards is an annual football award presented by Higher Institutions Football League (HiFL). It was first presented in 2018 as part of a series of event to commemorate the close of the inaugural season to recognize and celebrate outstanding performers in the league.

The HiFL Elite Team Of The Season

Team Formation 3-4-3

References 

Football in Nigeria